was a Japanese arcade game magazine, published by Enterbrain.

History
Monthly Arcadia launched on December 8, 1999. It was the successor to the then popular magazine Gamest by the bankrupt publisher Shinseisha. The first issue of Monthly Arcadia was subtitled "Coin op'ed videogame magazine" and later issues "Arcade video game machine magazine". 

The magazine was published monthly from its start to June 2013, when its frequency was switched to bi-monthly. The last issue, cover-dated April 2015, was published in February 2015.

Table of contents
Later issues of Monthly Arcadia were typically subdivided into the following sections:
 several "Feature" sections
 Special supplement (DVD)
 Game
 Index
 Ad

References

External links
 Monthly Arcadia PDF magazine archive (incomplete)

1999 establishments in Japan
2015 disestablishments in Japan
Bi-monthly magazines
Defunct magazines published in Japan
Magazines established in 1999
Magazines disestablished in 2015
Magazines published in Tokyo
Monthly magazines published in Japan
Video game magazines published in Japan
Enterbrain